Auguste Amant Constant Fidèle Edouart (1789–1861) was a French-born portrait artist who worked in England, Scotland and the United States in the 19th century. He specialised in silhouette portraits.

Biography
Born in Dunkerque, he left France in 1814, and established himself in London, where he began his career making portraits from hair. In 1825, he began work as a silhouette portraitist, taking full-length likenesses in profile by cutting out black paper with scissors. Edouart spent fifteen years touring England and in 1829 arrived in Edinburgh. He remained there for three years, during which time he produced some 5,000 likenesses. Edouart travelled in the United States in about 1839–49, visiting New York, Boston and other locales. 

He later returned to France, where he worked on smaller silhouettes. They included one of the most notable writers of this period, Victor Hugo.

Portraits
Edouart created portraits of hundreds of subjects, including:
Samuel Appleton and family
Fanny Brawne
Captain Edward Bolton
William Buckland, Frank Buckland
Charles Burroughs
Henry Clay
John Connell and family
Susan Edmonstone Ferrier
Samuel Freeman
Samuel Griswold Goodrich
Sarah Josepha Hale
Thaddeus Mason Harris
Josiah Harlan
Robert Knox
Francis Lieber
Liston, comedian
Henry Wadsworth Longfellow
John Loudoun McAdam
John Moss (see American Collector Magazine September 1943)
Stephen Olin
Theophilus Parsons
Samuel Jarvis Peters
Walter Scott
Daniel Webster

Image gallery

Collections
Works by Edouart reside in the collections of the National Portrait Gallery, London; National Galleries of Scotland; Crawford Art Gallery, Cork; New York Historical Society; Smithsonian National Portrait Gallery; the Museum of Fine Arts, Boston; Historic New England; and the American Jewish Historical Society, New York.

Exhibitions
The Art of the Silhouette in 19th-century Cork, which included works by Edouart, Stephen O’Driscoll (c.1825-1895), and miniature portraits of members of the Crawford Family, was held at Crawford Art Gallery, Cork in 2015.

"Black Out: Silhouettes Then and Now", which included works by Edouart, Moses Williams, and others, held at the National Portrait Gallery, Washington D.C. May 31, 2018 to March 10, 2019, and the Birmingham Museum of Art, Birmingham AL, September 28, 2019 to January 12, 2020.

References

Further reading
Edouart. A Treatise on Silhouette Likenesses by Monsieur Edouart, Silhouettist to the French Royal Family, and patronized by His Royal Highness, the late Duke of Gloucester and the principal Nobility of England, Scotland, and Ireland. 1835
The Man Who Saved His Life by Giving His Body for Dissection. Barre Gazette (Massachusetts); Date: 03-28-1845
Andrew W. Tuer. Art of Silhouetting. English illustrated magazine. 1890. Google books
Alice Van Leer Carrick. Shades of our ancestors: American profiles and profilists. Little, Brown, and Company, 1928. Google books
Andrew Oliver. Auguste Edouart's Silhouettes of Eminent Americans, 1839-1844. Charlottesville: University of Virginia Press, 1977

External links

WorldCat. Edouart, Augustin-Amant-Constant-Fidèle 1789-1861
Smithsonian. Auguste Edouart Self-Portrait, 1843
Flickr. Portrait by Edouart of Sarah Josepha Buell Hale (1788–1879)
Library of Congress. Silhouette profile of artist Charles Fenderich, by Edouart
Flickr. Work by Edouart
Flickr. Silhouette in clasp of velvet choker
American Jewish Historical Society. 22 silhouettes by Edouart

1789 births
1861 deaths
American portrait painters
French portrait painters
1840s in the United States
People from Dunkirk
Silhouettists